Adam Blackwood (born 14 July 1959) is an English actor.

Early life
Blackwood was born in Chichester, West Sussex, the only son of Rona (née Archer) and John Blackwood. He attended the Royal Academy of Dramatic Art (RADA).

Career
Blackwood played Balazar in the first four episodes of the 1986 Doctor Who serial The Trial of a Time Lord. He has provided the voice of James Bond in four video games: The World Is Not Enough (Nintendo 64 and PlayStation), 007 Racing,  Tomorrow Never Dies, and 007: Agent Under Fire.

Blackwood retired from acting in 2002 and since then has run Private Drama Events, a company specialising in corporate storytelling

Personal life
Blackwood has an older sister, Nicola, and a younger sister, Catriona. In 1989, he married Nicola King in Haywards Heath, West Sussex. They have a son named Thomas and a daughter named Ruby.

Filmography

Film

Television

Video games

External links

Alumni of RADA
English male voice actors
English male television actors
English male film actors
Living people
1959 births